There is no embassy of the United States of America in Vanuatu.

Diplomatic presence of the United States of America in Vanuatu began in September 1986 when the latter established diplomatic ties with US. The United States Embassy in Port Moresby, Papua New Guinea handles the US interests in Vanuatu. In addition to Papua New Guinea, United States Ambassador to Papua New Guinea is accredited to both Vanuatu and Solomon Islands.

Ambassadors

Notes

See also
United States – Vanuatu relations
Foreign relations of Vanuatu
Ambassadors of the United States

References
United States Department of State: Background notes on Vanuatu

External links
United States Department of State: Chiefs of Mission for Vanuatu
United States Department of State: Vanuatu
United States Embassy in Port Moresby

Vanuatu

United States